Tony Enrique Blanco Cabrera (born November 10, 1980) is a Dominican professional baseball player. He is mainly a first baseman, third baseman and outfielder. Blanco plays for the Orix Buffaloes of Nippon Professional Baseball (NPB). He has also played in Major League Baseball for the Washington Nationals and the Chunichi Dragons, Yokohama DeNA BayStars of NPB.

Career

Blanco began his career in the Boston Red Sox farm system as a third baseman. In , he was traded to the Cincinnati Reds as a player to be named later, completing an earlier trade that sent Todd Walker to Boston. Blanco was picked up by the Nationals as a Rule 5 Draft choice in 2005 and started the year playing for the Potomac Nationals. Blanco was invited to spring training for the big league club and quickly made it to the roster early in 2005, playing in 56 games. During , his rookie season, he hit .177 with one home run and seven RBI.

In , Blanco played for the Double-A Tulsa Drillers in the Colorado Rockies organization batting .323 with 23 home runs and 88 RBI. After the 2008 season, Blanco played in the Dominican Winter League for the Estrellas Orientales. He was then acquired by the Chunichi Dragons, who released their cleanup hitter Tyrone Woods due to his high wage, shortly after that.

His first year in NPB was very successful, and he became known for his incredible power. Examples of his power include a grounded home run in Nagoya Dome(first in dome history), hitting the light unit above the advertisement board in Tokyo Dome, as well as hitting the top-level stand in the Nagoya and Osaka Domes. He finished his first season with an impressive 39 HR and 110 RBI, both leading in Central League, along with a .275 batting average. Other than the HR and RBI award, he was also rewarded as Central League Performance Award in Interleague game (11 HR and 24 RBI) and won the Home Run Derby before the All-star game (which he was also playing as Central League first baseman).

References

External links

1980 births
Living people
Augusta GreenJackets players
Chattanooga Lookouts players
Chunichi Dragons players
Dominican Republic expatriate baseball players in Japan
Dominican Republic expatriate baseball players in the United States
Dominican Summer League Red Sox players
Gulf Coast Red Sox players
Hagerstown Suns players
Harrisburg Senators players
Lowell Spinners players
Major League Baseball left fielders
Major League Baseball players from the Dominican Republic
Major League Baseball third basemen
New Orleans Zephyrs players
Nippon Professional Baseball first basemen
Orix Buffaloes players
People from San Juan de la Maguana
Sarasota Red Sox players
Tulsa Drillers players
Washington Nationals players
Yokohama DeNA BayStars players